Christos (Christoforos) Kozyrakis (born 1974) is a Professor of Electrical Engineering and Computer Science at Stanford University, where he leads the multi-scale architecture & systems team (MAST). His current research interests are on resource efficient cloud computing, energy efficient compute and memory systems, and architectural support for security. Kozyrakis was the 2015 ACM Maurice Wilkes Award for outstanding contributions to transactional memory systems.

Kozyrakis holds a Ph.D. degree from UC Berkeley (advised by David A. Patterson) and a B.Sc. from University of Crete. He is an IEEE fellow and an ACM fellow.

References

External links
Christos Kozyrakis homepage
Christos Kozyrakis profile at Google Scholar
The Maurice Wilkes Award

Living people
Greek computer scientists
Computer designers
University of Crete alumni
Fellow Members of the IEEE
Stanford University faculty
Stanford University Department of Computer Science faculty
Stanford University Department of Electrical Engineering faculty
Stanford University School of Engineering faculty
Fellows of the Association for Computing Machinery
Year of birth missing (living people)
Scientists from Heraklion